Hengam is a class of Landing Ship Heavy built by the Yarrow Shipbuilders Limited and operated by the Islamic Republic of Iran Navy.

Ships in the class
Ships of the class are:

See also 
 List of naval ship classes of Iran
 List of amphibious warfare ships

References

Footnotes

Sources 
 
 

Amphibious warfare vessel classes
Ships built in Scotland
Ship classes of the Islamic Republic of Iran Navy